Ignatius Anandappa (1 February 1939 – 4 July 2012) was a Sri Lankan cricket umpire. He stood in three Test matches between 1992 and 1993 and seven ODI games between 1992 and 1998.

See also
 List of Test cricket umpires
 List of One Day International cricket umpires

References

1939 births
2012 deaths
Sportspeople from Colombo
Sri Lankan Test cricket umpires
Sri Lankan One Day International cricket umpires